Taylor v. Riojas, 592 U.S. ___ (2020), was a United States Supreme Court case dealing with qualified immunity. It was the first case in which the Supreme Court relied on the obviousness of a constitutional violation to overturn a lower court's decision to grant qualified immunity.

Trent Taylor was an inmate in a Texas prison. He filed a pro se lawsuit alleging that he was confined for six days "in a pair of shockingly unsanitary cells." The District Court found no constitutional violation and granted summary judgment. The Fifth Circuit found that Taylor's rights were not violated, but concluded that summary judgment was still appropriate because the defendants "weren’t on 'fair warning' that their specific acts were unconstitutional." The Supreme Court summarily reversed in a per curiam decision. Justice Alito concurred in the judgment, because he agreed with the Court's decision on the merits, but disagreed with the Court's decision to review the case in the first place. Justice Thomas dissented without providing a written opinion.

References

2020 in United States case law
United States Supreme Court cases
United States Supreme Court cases of the Roberts Court